Paul Hyland may refer to:

Paul V. Hyland (1876–1966), architect in Nebraska, United States
Paul Hyland (boxer) (born 1984), Irish boxer